We Jam Econo: The Story of the Minutemen, is a full-length documentary about the influential 1980s punk rock band Minutemen, created by director Tim Irwin and producer Keith Schieron in association with Rocket Fuel Films. The film premiered on February 25, 2005 at the historic Warner Grand Theatre in San Pedro, California, after two years in production.

Synopsis
Poignant recent interviews with the band's two surviving members Mike Watt and George Hurley, as well as first-person anecdotes from notable musicians including Ian MacKaye, Flea, Henry Rollins and Thurston Moore, complement the archival concert and interview footage of the band.

Development
As fans of the band, director Tim Irwin and producer Keith Schieron had discussed making a documentary about Minutemen since they were in high school, around 1989. The two approached Mike Watt who gave the project a thumbs up and that inspired them to start calling and emailing potential interviewees.

The title is a lyric from their song "The Politics of Time." It's also referred to in a comment made near the end of the film by Mike Watt, in a 1985 interview, when the band is asked if they have anything else to say.  He answers for them: "We jam econo."  Econo was local slang for economic and described the band's dedication to low-cost record production and touring. It also describes the band's (and burgeoning underground independent music scene's) do-it-yourself attitude and philosophy.

Interviews 

Film includes interviews with the following individuals (in alphabetical order):

Milo Aukerman
Joe Baiza
Kevin Barrett
Scott Becker
Jello Biafra
Richard Bonney
Jack Brewer
Dez Cadena
Joe Carducci
Nels Cline
Byron Coley
Ed Crawford
Brother Dale
Richard Derrick
John Doe 
Chuck Dukowski
Ray Farrell
Flea
Michael C. Ford
Carlos Guitarlos
Grant Hart
Richard Hell
Pat Hoed
Rob Holzman
Randall Jahnson
Kjehl Johansen
Curt Kirkwood
Martin Lyon
Ian MacKaye
David Markey
Mike Martt
J Mascis
Brother Matt
Stephen McCllellan
Vince Meghrouni
Richard Meltzer
Mike Mills
Thurston Moore
W.T. Morgan
Chris Morris
Keith Morris
Brendan Mullen
Colin Newman
Greg Norton
Raymond Pettibon
Tony Platon
Lee Ranaldo
David Rees
Lisa Roeland
Nanette Roeland
Kira Roessler
Henry Rollins
Kurt Schellenbach
Spot
John Talley-Jones
Tom Watson
Jean Watt

DVD

The 2-disc DVD (with 16-page booklet) was released on June 27, 2006 on Plexifilm.

DISC 1: 
Feature "We Jam Econo - The Story of the Minutemen"
 Original music videos filmed by Louis 'Video Louis' Elovitz  [1984] "This Ain't No Picnic", "Ack Ack Ack Ack", "King of the Hill" & "Ain't Talkin' 'Bout Love" [not used] for: 
"This Ain't No Picnic" (directed by Randall Jahnson)
"Ack Ack Ack Ack" (directed by John Talley-Jones)
"King of the Hill" (directed by Randall Jahnson)
 19 Deleted Scenes and Interviews
 Uncut Bard College Interview (56min)

DISC 2:
Three live performances:

 The Starwood, West Hollywood, CA - November 18, 1980, songs include:
Swing To The Right
Fascist
Joe McCarthy's Ghost
Paranoid Chant
Tension
Contained
Fanatics
Art Analysis
Issued
Validation
Definitions
Warfare
Sickles & Hammers
Hollering
On Trial

 9:30 Club, Washington, D.C. - 1984, songs include:
Big Foist
Retreat
Toadies
Anxious Mo-fo
Love Dance
Static
Search
Cut
Plight
Working Men Are Pissed
Ack Ack Ack
Life As A Rehearsal
Beacon Sighted Through Fog
The Only Minority
Mutiny In Jonestown
Maybe Partying Will Help
Political Song For Michael Jackson To Sing
The Roar Of The Masses Could Be Farts
Mr. Robot's Holy Orders
One Reporter's Opinion
God Bows To Math
Please Don't Be Gentle With Me
Joe McCarthy's Ghost
The Punch Line
Definitions
The Anchor
Bob Dylan Wrote Propaganda Songs
This Ain't No Picnic
There Ain't Shit On TV Tonight
No Exchange
Self-Referenced
Dream Told By Moto
Corona
I Felt Like A Gringo
Do You Want New Wave Or Do You Want The Truth?
Little Man With A Gun In His Hand

 Acoustic Blowout (Public-access television Show) - Hollywood, CA - 1985, songs include:
Corona
Themselves
The Red And The Black
Badges
I Felt Like A Gringo
Time
Green River 
Lost
Ack Ack Ack
History Lesson Pt. II
Tour Spiel
Little Man With A Gun In His Hand

Reception
The A.V. Club declared "We Jam Econo catches a lot of what made the Minutemen great" and said "The cold comfort that We Jam Econo offers is the notion that genius is fleeting, and the best anyone can hope for is that someone will record it before it fades." Variety called it "a suitably unfussy tribute to a band that disdained even the slightest rock-star flash" and predicted the DVD release would be "a must-have for music aficionados." PopMatters said We Jam Econo was " an endearing, heartfelt documentary that's made by the devout, for the devout, but which is sure to win over anyone except the occasional racist who mistakenly intended to watch a movie about border vigilantes."

References

External links 
 Official DVD site features video excerpts
 Preview Trailer from the Official Minutemen website
 Interview with the producer, Keith Schieron
 
 

2005 films
Documentary films about punk music and musicians
2000s English-language films